Cedar Grove is a historic home located near La Plata, Charles County, Maryland, United States. It is a three-part house in the late Federal style, and built about 1854 by Francis Boucher Franklin Burgess. The house consists of a -story main block with a two-part east wing, all of common bond brick construction. There are several outbuildings, including two large barns, a small cattle barn, and several sheds.

Cedar Grove was listed on the National Register of Historic Places in 1979.

References

External links
, including photo from 1978, at Maryland Historical Trust

Houses in Charles County, Maryland
Houses on the National Register of Historic Places in Maryland
Federal architecture in Maryland
Houses completed in 1854
National Register of Historic Places in Charles County, Maryland